Loverboy is a Canadian rock band.

Loverboy or Lover Boy may also refer to:

Film 
 Lover Boy (1975 film), an Italian film by Marino Girolami
 Lover Boy (1985 film), an Indian Hindi film by Shomu Mukherjee
 Lover Boy (1989 film), an Australian film directed by Geoffrey Wright
 Loverboy (1989 film), an American comedy starring Patrick Dempsey
 Loverboy (2005 film), an American drama directed by Kevin Bacon
 Loverboy (2011 film), a Romanian drama

Albums
 Loverboy (Brett Dennen album), 2011
 Loverboy (Loverboy album), 1980
 Lover Boy (album), a 2003 album by Ariel Pink

Songs
 "Loverboy" (Billy Ocean song), 1984
 "Loverboy" (Mariah Carey song), 2001
 "Loverboy" (You Me at Six song), 2011
 "Lover Boy", a song by Mika from The Boy Who Knew Too Much
 "Lover Boy", a song by Scarlett Belle
 “Lover Boy”, a song by Phum Viphurit

Other uses 
 The "Loverboy method": see Procuring (prostitution)#Grooming
 Loverboys, a 1996 story collection by Ana Castillo